Preben Krab (born 15 July 1952) is a Danish rower who competed in the 1968 Summer Olympics.

He was born in Gammel Haderslev, Region of Southern Denmark and is the younger brother of Jørn Krab.

In 1968 he was the coxswain of the Danish boat which won the bronze medal in the coxed pairs event.

External links
 profile

1952 births
Living people
Danish male rowers
Coxswains (rowing)
Olympic rowers of Denmark
Rowers at the 1968 Summer Olympics
Olympic bronze medalists for Denmark
Olympic medalists in rowing
Medalists at the 1968 Summer Olympics
People from Haderslev Municipality
Sportspeople from the Region of Southern Denmark